Michael Jai White (born November 10, 1967) is an American actor, director and martial artist. He was the first African American to portray a major comic book superhero in a major motion picture, starring as Al Simmons, the protagonist in the 1997 film Spawn. White appeared as Marcus Williams in the Tyler Perry films Why Did I Get Married? and Why Did I Get Married Too?, and starred as the character on the TBS/OWN comedy-drama television series Tyler Perry's For Better or Worse. White portrayed Jax Briggs in Mortal Kombat: Legacy and the Cyborg Seth in Universal Soldier: The Return. He portrayed boxer Mike Tyson in the 1995 HBO television film Tyson. He also played the title role in the blaxploitation parody film Black Dynamite, as well as the animated series of the same name.

Early life
White is a martial artist in nine different styles: Shōtōkan, Goju-Ryu (for which he studied under Master Eddie Morales where he learned to sharpen his Goju karate technique), Taekwondo, Kobudō, Tang Soo Do, Wushu, Jiu Jitsu, Kyokushin and Boxing, with a specific focus in Kyokushin Karate (although his style incorporates aspects of many different martial arts forms). White started training in the martial arts at the age of four in Jiu Jitsu. He next took up Shōtōkan and moved on to other styles later.

White is a former special education teacher and taught students with behavioral problems for three years. He cites his history in education as the reason why, despite his personal love for the music genre on "a lot of levels", he cannot "in good [conscience]" have a positive opinion on hip hop or "excuse some of [its] pervasive and destructive elements", mainly due to his experience with youngsters who had difficulty seeing the difference between it and real life.

Acting career
White's first major starring role and breakout performance was in the 1995 HBO film Tyson, as heavyweight boxer Mike Tyson. He portrayed the eponymous character in the 1997 film Spawn, making him the first African American to portray a major comic book superhero in a major motion picture.  His work in Spawn earned him a nomination for the Blockbuster Entertainment Award. White starred opposite Jean-Claude Van Damme in Universal Soldier: The Return, in 1999. A few years earlier, he acted in Full Contact, with Jerry Trimble. In 2001, he also starred opposite fellow martial artist Steven Seagal in Exit Wounds. In 2003, he starred in Busta Rhymes and Mariah Carey's music video "I Know What You Want". Since 2003, in addition to his on screen roles, White has been doing voice work, including in Static Shock and Justice League.  White showcases his martial arts skills in the direct-to-DVD film Undisputed II: Last Man Standing. He also appears in Michelle Yeoh's Silver Hawk in 2004. He appeared in Kill Bill: Volume 2, although his role was cut from the theatrical release. His film Why Did I Get Married? opened at number one at the box office on October 12, 2007.

White played the role of the mob boss Gambol in the 2008 film The Dark Knight. He also starred in the film Blood and Bone and the blaxploitation homage Black Dynamite, both released in 2009. White wrote the scripts for both Black Dynamite and his upcoming 3 Bullets in which he stars with Bokeem Woodbine.

On March 30, 2010, White appeared on The Mo'Nique Show to promote his film Why Did I Get Married Too. The two joked about the acclaim that comes with winning an Oscar. In May of that year he appeared in the music video for Toni Braxton's new song "Hands Tied" from her album Pulse, as well as the Nicki Minaj music video for "Your Love" as Nicki's sensei and love interest.

He also starred in Kevin Tancharoen's short film Mortal Kombat: Rebirth, as Jax Briggs, and reprised the role in Mortal Kombat: Legacy, a webseries from the same director. He recently posted on Twitter that he would not be returning to the role for the second season, but would return for the 2013 film.

White made his directorial debut and starred in Never Back Down 2: The Beatdown, which was released on home video on September 13, 2011.

White also provided the voice of Green Lantern in the video game Justice League Heroes.

In October 2019, White announced the spiritual successor to Black Dynamite titled The Outlaw Johnny Black officially entered pre-production. Despite the Indiegogo campaign not reaching its goal, he was still able to secure enough backers and additional donors to get the project off the ground. It is currently available for pre-order on the official website, although a release date has not been announced or confirmed.

In October 2020, White's latest film Welcome to Sudden Death debuted on Netflix and became one of the most watched films on the platform. The Universal Pictures Home Entertainment release is a remake of the 1995 film Sudden Death starring Jean-Claude Van Damme.

On July 12, 2021, White laid out a vision for starting a film studio in New Haven, CT called "Jaigantic Studios". He wants to create a studio district on New Haven's Quinnipiac River waterfront.

Personal life

From 2005 to 2011, White was married to Courtenay Chatman and together they have a daughter named Morgan. In addition, White has two sons. In February 2014, White announced his engagement to actress Gillian Iliana Waters. In April 2015, White penned an open letter via Facebook entitled "Apologies to My Ex's", where he credited Waters for helping him become, "the very best version of myself."  In July 2015, White married Waters in Thailand. They appeared together in the martial arts thriller movie Take Back (2021), with Gillian White starring as the female lead.

In 2014, White was honored with the Fists of Legends Decade Award at the Urban Action Showcase & Expo at HBO. On November 8, 2019, he assumed the "Mantle of The Black Dragon" from Ron van Clief, Don "The Dragon" Wilson, Cynthia Rothrock, and Taimak, in a ceremony at the 2019 Urban Action Showcase & Expo at AMC 25, NYC.

Filmography

Film

Television

Stunts

Video games

Web series

Music videos

Notes

References
 22.^https://www.familytreenow.com/search/people/results?first=Michael&middle=Jai&last=White&dobyyyy=1964&rid=asa&smck=FT_juX0AYSsyu_h-lluOXQ Correct date of birth.

External links
 
 

1967 births
Living people
Male actors from New York City
Male actors from Bridgeport, Connecticut
Film directors from New York City
Film directors from Connecticut
African-American film directors
African-American male actors
American jujutsuka
American male film actors
American male karateka
American male taekwondo practitioners
American male television actors
American people of Ghanaian descent
American tang soo do practitioners
American wushu practitioners
Gōjū-ryū practitioners
Kyokushin kaikan practitioners
Shotokan practitioners
Central High School (Connecticut) alumni
20th-century American male actors
21st-century American male actors